Belle Vue Quarry is a 3.2 hectare biological Site of Special Scientific Interest in Dorset, notified in 1977.

It is used as a roosting site by Greater Horseshoe bats.

Sources
 English Nature citation sheet for the site (accessed 29 August 2006)

External links
 English Nature website (SSSI information)

Bat roosts
Isle of Purbeck
Sites of Special Scientific Interest in Dorset
Sites of Special Scientific Interest notified in 1977
Quarries in Dorset